Dothidotthia is a genus of fungi in the family Botryosphaeriaceae. There are 11 species.

Species
Dothidotthia andersonii
Dothidotthia aspera
Dothidotthia celtidis
Dothidotthia diapensiae
Dothidotthia fruticola
Dothidotthia lasioderma
Dothidotthia melanococca
Dothidotthia quercicola
Dothidotthia ramulicola
Dothidotthia scabra
Dothidotthia symphoricarpi

References

Botryosphaeriales